The 1932–33 Copa México was the 17th staging of this Mexican football cup competition that existed from 1907.

The competition started on June 18, 1933 and concluded on July 23, 1933 in which Necaxa lifted the trophy for third time after a 3–1 victory over Germania FV.

Preliminary round

Final phase

References
Mexico - Statistics of Copa México in season 1932/1933. (RSSSF)

Copa Mexico, 1932-33
Copa MX
Copa